In statistical hypothesis testing, the error exponent of a hypothesis testing procedure is the rate at which the probabilities of Type I and Type II decay exponentially with the size of the sample used in the test.

Formally, the error exponent of a test is defined as the limiting value of the ratio of the negative logarithm of the error probability to the sample size for large sample sizes:  . Error exponents for different hypothesis tests are computed using Sanov's theorem and other results from large deviations theory.

Error exponents in binary hypothesis testing
Consider a binary hypothesis testing problem in which observations are modeled as independent and identically distributed random variables under each hypothesis. Let  denote the observations. Let  denote the probability density function of each observation  under the null hypothesis  and let  denote the probability density function of each observation  under the alternate hypothesis .

In this case there are two possible error events. Error of type 1, also called false positive, occurs when the null hypothesis is true and it is wrongly rejected. Error of type 2, also called false negative, occurs when the alternate hypothesis is true and null hypothesis is not rejected. The probability of type 1 error is denoted  and the probability of type 2 error is denoted .

Optimal error exponent for Neyman–Pearson testing
In the Neyman–Pearson version of binary hypothesis testing, one is interested in minimizing the probability of type 2 error  subject to the constraint that the probability of type 1 error  is less than or equal to a pre-specified level . In this setting, the optimal testing procedure is a likelihood-ratio test. The error exponent  is the Kullback–Leibler divergence between the probability distributions of the observations under the two hypotheses. This exponent is also referred to as the Chernoff–Stein lemma exponent.

Optimal error exponent for average error probability in Bayesian hypothesis testing
In the Bayesian version of binary hypothesis testing one is interested in minimizing the average error probability under both hypothesis, assuming a prior probability of occurrence on each hypothesis. Let  denote the prior probability of hypothesis .

References

Statistical hypothesis testing
Information theory
Large deviations theory